Since July 2009, Israeli broadcast monitoring service Media Forest has been publishing four rankings which list the top ten most-broadcast Romanian and foreign songs on Romanian radio stations and television channels separately on a weekly basis. The charts consider data from eight radio stations—Digi FM, Europa FM, Kiss FM, Magic FM, Pro FM, Radio ZU, Radio România Actualități and Virgin Radio Romania—and five television channels—1 Music Channel, Kiss TV, MTV Romania, UTV Romania and ZU TV. Chart placings are based on the number of times tracks are broadcast, determined by acoustic fingerprinting.

Media Forest also releases year-end charts in regards to the radio airplay, listing the most-broadcast songs of Romanian origin of the respective year, weighted by the official audience numbers provided by Asociația pentru Radio Audiență (Romanian Association for Audience Numbers). During the 2010s, around 200 singles each were listed by Media Forest as the most-broadcast tracks on radio and television respectively. The first were "I Gotta Feeling" by the Black Eyed Peas (radio) and "Chica Bomb" by Dan Balan (television).

"Shoulda" by Jamie Woon spent an unprecedented 20 weeks as the most-broadcast single on radio stations, while in terms of television airplay, this feat was achieved by "Luna" by Carla's Dreams with a total of 15 weeks. Carla's Dreams and Smiley had eight songs listed as the most-broadcast on radio and television during the 2010s, more than any other act. "Dance Monkey" by Tones and I was the final top song of the 2010s on both listings. In terms of radio airplay, reports by Media Forest indicate that Cat Music was the most successful label of 2017; Global Records claimed that accolade in 2018 and 2019. Kiss FM, Pro FM and Virgin Radio Romania were the trendsetting radio stations in those years respectively, meaning they broadcast Media Forest's top weekly radio songs the most.

Most-broadcast songs

Radio

Television

Notes

References

Romanian record charts
Number-one singles
Romania Singles
2010s (decade)